Charles Bowne "Chip" Peterson (born December 3, 1987) is an American competition swimmer who specializes is long-distance freestyle swimming, especially open water swimming, in which he is a world champion.

Career

At the 2005 World Aquatics Championships, Peterson won gold in the 10 km event and a silver medal position behind Germany's Thomas Lurz in the 5-kilometer event. Peterson was jointly awarded the inaugural Open Water Swimmer of the Year by Swimming World magazine with Lurz.  Peterson also earned a gold medal in the 1500 meter freestyle at the 2005 Summer Nationals in Irvine, California. Peterson won gold in the men's 1500 meter freestyle as well as a silver in the men's 10K open water swim at the 2007 Pan American Games held in Rio de Janeiro, Brazil. At the 2010 ACC Swimming and Diving Championships Peterson won the 1650yd freestyle in a time of 14:49.36, fourth in the 500 yard freestyle with a time of 4:20.23. At the 2010 NCAA Swimming and Diving Championships Peterson competed in the 1650, 500, and 200 yard freestyles placing 13th in the 1650 free and 14th in the 500 fr

Personal

Peterson attended the University of North Carolina, where he swam for the North Carolina Tar Heels swimming and diving team.  During his freshman year, he set the Tar Heels team records in three events: the 500-, 1000-, and 1650-yard freestyle.  At the Atlantic Coast Conference (ACC) championships, Peterson placed second in the 1650-yard freestyle and fifth in the 500-yard freestyle.  He was the subject of a feature story that ran in The Daily Tar Heel during the year.

Peterson's father, Pete, is a professor of Marine Sciences at UNC.  He was named the 2010 ACC Men's Swimming and Diving Scholar-Athlete of the Year.

External links
 Chip Peterson's bio on UNC's website
 North Carolina's Chip Peterson Named 2010 ACC Men's Swimming & Diving Scholar-Athlete of the Year

Living people
1987 births
American long-distance swimmers
American male freestyle swimmers
Male long-distance swimmers
People from Morehead City, North Carolina
Swimmers at the 2007 Pan American Games
Swimmers at the 2015 Pan American Games
World Aquatics Championships medalists in open water swimming
Pan American Games gold medalists for the United States
Pan American Games silver medalists for the United States
Pan American Games medalists in swimming
Medalists at the 2007 Pan American Games
Medalists at the 2015 Pan American Games
20th-century American people
21st-century American people